Malacca is one of the states in Malaysia that awards honours and titles.

2004
 Abdullah Badawi is sole recipient of the Darjah Utama Negeri Melaka (DUNM), which carries the title "Datuk Seri Utama".
 5 recipients of the Darjah Gemilang Seri Melaka (DGSM), which carries the title "Datuk Seri".
 5 recipients of the Darjah Cemerlang Seri Melaka (DCSM), which carries the title "Datuk Wira".
 73 recipients of the Darjah Mulia Seri Melaka (DMSM), which carries the title "Datuk".

2003
 Datin Seri Dr Siti Hasmah Mohd Ali is sole recipient of the Darjah Utama Negeri Melaka (DUNM), which carries the title "Datuk Seri Utama".
 2 recipients of the Darjah Gemilang Seri Melaka (DGSM), which carries the title "Datuk Seri".
 3 recipients of the Darjah Cemerlang Seri Melaka (DCSM), which carries the title "Datuk Wira".
 46 recipients of the Darjah Mulia Seri Melaka (DMSM), which carries the title "Datuk"

2002
 1 recipient Darjah Gemilang Seri Melaka (DGSM), which carries the title "Datuk Seri"
 5 recipients of the Darjah Cemerlang Seri Melaka (DCSM), which carries the title "Datuk Wira".
 72 recipients of the Darjah Mulia Seri Melaka (DMSM), which carries the title "Datuk".

External links
Bernama - PM Heads Malacca Honours List giving full list of recipients, 9 October 2004.
The Star - The Malacca Yang Di-Pertua Negri's Birthday Honours List, 12 October 2003.
The Star - 410 receive Malacca awards, 15 October 2002.

Malaysian honours list
Malacca